Gian Giacomo Trivulzio (1440 or 1441 – December 5, 1518) was an Italian aristocrat and condottiero who held several military commands during the Italian Wars.

Biography
Trivulzio was born in Milan, where he studied, among others, with Galeazzo Maria Sforza. In 1465, he followed the latter's army in France to help King Louis XI of France. He also took part in the Milanese campaigns against Bartolomeo Colleoni and fought alongside Federico III da Montefeltro in the wars in Romagna.

In 1478, he supported the Florentines against Pope Sixtus IV's expansionism. Two years later, he acquired the castle of Mesocco. In 1483, he abandoned Ludovico Sforza and switched his allegiance to Charles VIII of France. In 1484, he defeated the Venetians at Martinengo.

In 1488, he married Beatrice d'Avalos, after his first wife (Margherita Colleoni) had died. In June the same year, he moved to southern Italy, entering the service of the Kingdom of Naples and its ruler Ferdinand of Aragon. The same year, Isabella of Aragon, daughter of Prince Alfonso and granddaughter of King Ferdinand, married Gian Galeazzo Sforza, formally Duke of Milan. In 1493, the young duke asked his father-in-law for support to regain his ducal power from his uncle, the Regent Ludovico il Moro. Ludovico then asked Charles VIII to invade Naples. Charles swept away any resistance in Italy and soon forced the Neapolitans to sign a peace treaty. The treaty was negotiated by Trivulzio, who in the meantime had been named commander-in-chief of the Neapolitan army. Impressed by Trivulzio's capabilities, Charles decided to engage him, with Ferdinand's permission, for a salary of 10,000 ducats a year.

Trivulzio marched toward France with Charles' army. When the retreating French were attacked by the League of Venice in the Battle of Fornovo (1495), he fought with the French army. On June 15, 1495, he was appointed governor of Asti and was given noble titles and territories in France. After Charles died in 1498, his successor, Louis XII, mustered a large army under Trivulzio to conquer the Duchy of Milan from Ludovico. Trivulzio took several fortified towns and forced Ludovico to abandon Milan. On 6 October 1499, he presented Louis XII with the keys of the city. Louis made him governor of Milan; he had already made him a Marshal of France on 29 September.

Trivulzio also took part in the victorious Battle of Agnadello against the Republic of Venice, and commanded contingents of the French army at Novara and (this time allied with the Venetians against the Swiss) Marignano. In 1516, he successfully defended Milan from the assault of Emperor Maximilian I.

However, the high taxes insisted on by the French, and reports about his behavior as governor caused him to fall in disgrace soon afterwards. He went to France to regain his position from King Francis I of France, but in vain. He died at Arpajon (France) in 1518.

His nephew, Teodoro Trivulzio, was also a military commander under France, and was briefly governor of Milan, Genoa and Lyon.

Patronage of art
Trivulzio accumulated huge amounts of money, which he used in part as a patron of the arts, in particular of works by Bramantino. These include the Trivulzio Mausoleum in the Basilica of San Nazaro in Brolo, where he was buried, and the tapestries cycle of the Twelve Months,  now in the Castello Sforzesco in Milan.

Leonardo da Vinci converted his design for a large equestrian statue of Francesco Sforza to depict Trivulzio instead, but it never progressed beyond impressive drawings.

References

1440s births
1518 deaths
Military personnel from Milan
15th-century condottieri
Marshals of France
Military leaders of the Italian Wars
Generals of former Italian states
Gian Giacomo
16th-century condottieri